Mount Annan is a suburb of Sydney, in the state of New South Wales, Australia. Mount Annan is located 60 kilometres south-west of the Sydney central business district, in the local government areas of Camden Council and Campbelltown City Council, and is part of the Macarthur region. The Federal Electorates of Hume and Macarthur divide the Gardens.

History
The area now known as Mount Annan was originally home to the Dharawal people, based in the Illawarra region, although the Western Sydney-based Darug people and the Southern Highlands-based Gandangara people were also known to have inhabited the greater Camden area. Very early relations with British settlers were cordial but as farmers started clearing and fencing the land, affecting food resources in the area, clashes between the groups arose until 1816 when a number of indigenous people were massacred and the remainder retreated from direct conflict with the settlers.

In 1805, wool pioneer John Macarthur was granted 5,000 acres (20 km2) at Cowpastures (now Camden). After the land was cleared, it was used for farming for most of the next 200 years until Sydney's suburban sprawl reached the town of Camden and modern suburbs like Mount Annan were subdivided into housing blocks.

Transport
Mount Annan is off the Hume Highway. It includes the locality formerly known as Glenlee and the former Glenlee coal loader, which served the former Burragorang Valley coal mines. A number of bus services operated by Busabout Sydney run through the suburb. The nearest railway station is Macarthur.

Education
There are three local schools in the area. Mount Annan Public School  was built in 1993 and is located on Stenhouse Drive. Mount Annan High School  was built in 2003 and is located on Welling Drive. Mount Annan Christian College (MACC) which was built in 1999 and is located on Narellan Road.

Sport

Netball
Mount Annan is home to one netball club, Mount Annan Netball Club, which was founded in 1993. MANC is affiliated with the Camden and District Netball Association. There are approximately 300 players a year across 30 teams.

Soccer
Mount Annan Mustangs is Mount Annan's local soccer club. The group was formed in 1999 by Alan Dudley.

Cricket
Mount Annan is a part of the Cobbitty-Narellan Cricket Club. It is hosted at the Birriwa Reserve.

Swimming
Mount Annan Swimming Club is hosted at Mount Annan Leisure Centre, which is owned by YMCA, which runs its swimming season from October through to August.

Commercial area 

There are two notable shopping malls in the area, Mount Annan Marketplace and Mount Annan Central. There are also several restaurants in the area including Italian, Thai, Chinese, Japanese, American, and other cuisines.

Coles Express Mount Annan is the only petrol station, and is located on Waterworth Drive and Holdsworth Drive.

Mount Annan has an Anytime Fitness gym located on Main Street, and a leisure centre Mount Annan Leisure Centre (which also has a gym) located on Welling Drive. A pub known as Mount Annan Hotel is located on Main Street.

In addition to the Coles Express petrol station there is the Caltex Woolworths petrol station situated on Narellan Road across from the Mount Annan Shopping Centres, although this is located outside the suburb boundary and is in Smeaton Grange.

Churches 
 C3 Church Mount Annan

Landmarks 
The Australian Botanic Garden Mount Annan is primarily a native garden but is equipped with barbecuing facilities and picnic areas. Mount Annan is a hill within the grounds and there is a track in the gardens to the summit. Sundial Hill is another landmark of the gardens and there is a water feature area. The gardens also includes a Stolen Generations Memorial.

Demographics
In the 2016 Australian census, the suburb of Mount Annan had a population of 11,703 people, with a very high percentage of families with children (89.5%). The suburb is almost entirely detached houses (95.9%) with 141 dwellings recorded as either apartments or townhouses. A very high percentage of these houses are mortgaged (60.0%), a little under double the national average (34.5%).
 Aboriginal and Torres Strait Islander people made up 2.7% of the population.
 78.2% of people were born in Australia. The most common countries of birth were England 3.1%, New Zealand 1.3%, India 1.0% and Philippines 0.9%.
 82.4% of people only spoke English at home. Other languages spoken at home included Spanish 1.8%, Arabic 1.3%, Mandarin 0.9% and Hindi 0.9%. 
 The most common responses for religion in Mount Annan were Catholic 32.7%, Anglican 21.3% and No Religion 20.5%.

Local media

Newspapers 
 Camden Advertiser – the local weekly newspaper based in Camden. It is owned by Fairfax Media.
 Macarthur Advertiser – the region's weekly newspaper based in Macarthur. It is owned by Fairfax Media.

Websites 
 MountAnnan.net – local news and information

Governance 
Mount Annan lies in the central ward of Camden Council, currently represented by Rob Mills, Ashleigh Cagney and Theresa Fedeli. It sits within the state electorate of Camden, represented by Liberal Party of Australia's Chris Patterson, a former Mayor of Camden, and the federal electorate of Hume, represented by Liberal's Angus Taylor.

Notable residents 
 Jose Navarro – mayor
 Dan O'Connor – actor

References

External links

  [CC-By-SA]

Suburbs of Sydney
Mining towns in New South Wales
Camden Council (New South Wales)